Solo 4 C.I.T.A. is the fourth studio album by Dutch-English pop group Caught in the Act. It was released by ZYX Music on 23 November 1998 in German-speaking Europe. The album peaked at number 54 on the German Albums Chart.

Track listing
Adapted from album booklet.

Charts

Release history

References

1998 albums
Caught in the Act albums